Biffle is a surname. Notable people with the surname include:
 Greg Biffle (born 1969), American racing driver
 Jerome Biffle (1928–2002), American athlete